The 2010 Formula D season (officially titled Formula Drift Pro Championship) was the seventh season for the Formula D series. The series began on April 10 on the streets of Long Beach and concluded on October 9 at Toyota Speedway at Irwindale after seven events.

With two victories at Long Beach and Infineon Raceway, Vaughn Gittin took his first Formula D title by 63.5 points, taking the first non-Nissan championship since 2006. Tanner Foust's Scion tC finished second in the championship, having taken victories at Evergreen Speedway and Irwindale, but Gittin's consistent finishing gave him the advantage over Foust. Ryan Tuerck finished third in the championship, despite not winning any of the seven events to be held. Daijiro Yoshihara finished fourth after taking successive victories at Road Atlanta and Wall Township Speedway. Darren McNamara completed the top five in the championship, while Tyler McQuarrie took the other event win at Las Vegas Motor Speedway.

Schedule

Championship standings
Event winners in bold.

External links 
 Official Formula D Website

References

Formula D seasons
Formula D